Vikýřovice is a municipality and village in Šumperk District in the Olomouc Region of the Czech Republic. It has about 2,300 inhabitants.

History
The first written mention is from 1391. In 1975–1990, Vikýřovice was an administrative part of Šumperk.

Economy
Verner Motor company, a producer of aircraft engines, is based here.

References

Villages in Šumperk District